The Charlie Anway Cabin is a historic log cabin near Haines, Alaska, United States.  It was built out of hewn logs in 1903 by Charles H. Anway, the first homesteader to settle in the Haines area.  When first built, the cabin was L-shaped with a cross-gable roof with wood shingles.  Anway later extended the building, giving it a T shape, and added a layer of metal from flattened cans; the roof has since been covered in galvanized corrugated sheet metal.  Anway settled here and eventually produced crops which he sold at Fort William H. Seward.  He farmed until 1932, and died in 1949.  The cabin and two outbuildings are now owned by the Chilkoot Valley Historical Society.

The cabin was listed on the National Register of Historic Places in 2001.

See also
National Register of Historic Places listings in Haines Borough, Alaska

References

External links
 Chilkoot Valley Historic Society web site

1903 establishments in Alaska
Houses completed in 1903
Houses in Haines Borough, Alaska
Houses on the National Register of Historic Places in Alaska
Buildings and structures on the National Register of Historic Places in Haines Borough, Alaska